Lisa Vicari (born 11 February 1997) is a German actress. She is known for portraying Martha Nielsen in the Netflix series Dark and the lead role of Isi in the Netflix original film Isi & Ossi.

Biography
Vicari was born in Munich in 1997, into a family of doctors. She is of Italian descent. At the age of ten, she took an improvisational theatre course and shortly thereafter appeared in her first short film, Tunnelblicke. In 2010, she acted in the children's film Hanni & Nanni. The following year, she played Leonie in the post-apocalyptic film Hell. In 2017, Vicari starred as the title character in the Khaled Kaissar film Luna, in which she plays a teenager whose father is secretly a Russian agent and whose family is being wiped out before her eyes. From 2017 to 2020, she portrayed Martha Nielsen, the love interest of Jonas and sister of the missing Mikkel in the Netflix science fiction series Dark. Vicari studies media science in Potsdam.

In 2020, Vicari played Isi, the daughter of a billionaire, in the romantic comedy Isi & Ossi, one of the first German Netflix films.

Filmography

Awards and nominations
 Award for Best Young Talent at the New Faces Awards for the role of Leonie in Hell (2011)
 Nomination for the Young German Cinema Award at the Munich Film Festival for her role in Luna (2017)

References

External links
 
 Lisa Vicari at filmportal.de

21st-century German actresses
1997 births
Actresses from Munich
German film actresses
German television actresses
Living people

German people of Italian descent